The Orthokaryotes (Cavalier-Smith 2017) are a proposed Eukaryote clade consisting of the Jakobea and the Neokaryotes. Together with its sister Discicristata it forms a basal Eukaryote clade. They are characterized by stacked Golgi, orthogonal centrioles, and two opposite posterior ciliary roots.

Taxonomy 
A proposed cladogram is

References 

Eukaryote unranked clades